Artificial chromosome may refer to:

 Yeast artificial chromosome
 Bacterial artificial chromosome
 Human artificial chromosome
 P1-derived artificial chromosome
 Synthetic DNA of a base pair size comparable to a chromosome